Statistical regions of Montenegro are defined, as of 2011, by the Montenegrin Regional Development Law (Zakon o regionalnom razvoju). The regions, as defined by law, roughly correspond to the informal and colloquial division of Montenegro, often used by the Montenegrin media and citizens.

Regions are not administrative divisions per se; they are used for statistical and analytical purposes, to help create the outline for more uniform economic development of Montenegro. This official definition of the regions of Montenegro is one of many definitions that are in everyday use in the country. However, this division into three regions is most widespread:

List

Central Region
This region consists of six municipalities. It is the most populous of the regions, and contains the capital of Podgorica, historical capital of Cetinje, and the industrial center of Nikšić. Most of Montenegrin economic, cultural, educational and administration base is located within the region.

Prominent tribal, historical and geographical subregions in the central region are: Nikšići (Župa, Rudine), Golija, Banjani, Grahovo, Krivošije, Brda (Piperi, Rovca, Bratonožići, Kuči, Bjelopavlići, Lijeva rijeka), Zeta (Upper and Lower), Skenderija, Malesija, Old Montenegro (Pješivci, Čevo, Cuce, Bjelice, Njeguši, Cetinje field, Ceklin, Komani, Zagarač, Lješani and Rijeka).

Coastal Region
This southernmost region consists of municipalities with access to the Adriatic Sea. This region is mainly oriented towards tourism, and has a population of 146,784 (2003). Following municipalities make up the region:

Prominent tribal, historical and geographical subregions of the coastal statistical region are: Bay of Kotor, Grbalj, Budva riviera, Pobori, Brajići, Maine, Paštrovići, Spič, Crmnica, Bar, Mrkojevići, Ulcinj riviera and Skadarska Krajina.

Northern Region
Northern region comprises eleven municipalities and is the largest by area. It encompasses the sparsely populated mountainous part of Montenegro. With the decline of the heavy industries in the 1990s, the region has seen perpetual economic hardship and migration of the population to the two southern regions.

Prominent tribal, historical and geographical subregions of the northern statistical region are: Drobnjak (Uskoci, Jezera, Šaranci), Zatarje, Pljevlja, Piva, Brda (Morača (Upper and Lower), Vasojevići), Polja, Kolašin (Upper and Lower), Southern Sanjak, Plav and Gusinje, Bihor (Upper and Lower), Polimlje and Potarje.

See also
Geography of Montenegro
Tourism in Montenegro
National parks of Montenegro
Municipalities of Montenegro

References

Subdivisions of Montenegro
Regions of Montenegro
Demographics of Montenegro
Montenegro